The Cane River National Heritage Trail is a Louisiana Scenic Byway that follows several different state highways, primarily:
LA 1, LA 119, and LA 494 generally along the east bank of the Cane River from Lena to Natchitoches; and
LA 6 and LA 485 branching off of the river from Natchitoches to Allen via Robeline.

References

Louisiana Scenic Byways
Tourist attractions in Natchitoches Parish, Louisiana
Tourist attractions in Rapides Parish, Louisiana
Scenic highways in Louisiana